Kokologo or Kokologho is a department or commune of Boulkiemdé Province in central Burkina Faso. As of 2005, it had a population of 40,621. Its capital lies at the town of Kokologho.

Towns and villages
KokologhoBasziriDouréGoulouréKoulnatengaManegaNidagaPitmoagaSakoinséSam

References

Departments of Burkina Faso
Boulkiemdé Province